Protestants in Haiti are a significant minority of the population.  The CIA Factbook reports that around 28.5% of the population is Protestant (Baptist 15.4%, Pentecostal 7.9%, Adventist 3%, Methodist 1.5% other 0.7%). Other sources put the Protestant population higher than this, suggesting that it may form one-third of the population today, as Protestant churches have experienced significant growth in recent decades.

Protestant churches of significant size include the Assemblées de Dieu, the Convention Baptiste d'Haïti, the Seventh-day Adventists, the Church of God (Cleveland), the Anglican/Episcopal Church, the Methodist Church in the Caribbean and Americas, the Church of the Nazarene and the Mission Evangelique Baptiste du Sud-Haiti.

Whereas a very small amount of Catholic Haitians combine their faith with aspects of Vodou, this practice is much more rare among Haitian Protestants, whose churches tend to strongly denounce Vodou as diabolical.

References

Sources 
Protestants by country
Haiti#Demographics
World Christian Encyclopedia, 2001 edition, Volume 1, page 342